Schock (German for Shock) is the sixth studio album by German band Eisbrecher.

Track listing

Bonus track

iTunes bonus track

Music videos
 "Zwischen uns"
 "Rot wie die Liebe"

Charts and sales

Media Control Charts - #2
Ö3 Austria Top 40 - #11
Swiss Music Charts - #16

Schock has sold over 100,000 copies across Germany as of April 11, 2016, earning Gold status.

References 

Eisbrecher albums
2015 albums
German-language albums